The Buryatia Constituency (No.9) is a Russian legislative constituency in the Republic of Buryatia. The constituency is the only one in Buryatia, and occupies the whole of its territory.

Members elected

Election results

1993

|-
! colspan=2 style="background-color:#E9E9E9;text-align:left;vertical-align:top;" |Candidate
! style="background-color:#E9E9E9;text-align:left;vertical-align:top;" |Party
! style="background-color:#E9E9E9;text-align:right;" |Votes
! style="background-color:#E9E9E9;text-align:right;" |%
|-
|style="background-color:"|
|align=left|Nikolay Kondakov
|align=left|Independent
|
|20.79%
|-
| colspan="5" style="background-color:#E9E9E9;"|
|- style="font-weight:bold"
| colspan="3" style="text-align:left;" | Total
| 
| 100%
|-
| colspan="5" style="background-color:#E9E9E9;"|
|- style="font-weight:bold"
| colspan="4" |Source:
|
|}

1995

|-
! colspan=2 style="background-color:#E9E9E9;text-align:left;vertical-align:top;" |Candidate
! style="background-color:#E9E9E9;text-align:left;vertical-align:top;" |Party
! style="background-color:#E9E9E9;text-align:right;" |Votes
! style="background-color:#E9E9E9;text-align:right;" |%
|-
|style="background-color:"|
|align=left|Svetlana Naychukova
|align=left|Independent
|
|21.76%
|-
|style="background-color:"|
|align=left|Nikolay Kondakov (incumbent)
|align=left|Communist Party
|
|18.60%
|-
|style="background-color:#23238E"|
|align=left|Vladimir Belousov
|align=left|Our Home – Russia
|
|13.19%
|-
|style="background-color:"|
|align=left|Nimazhap Ilyukhinov
|align=left|Independent
|
|8.28%
|-
|style="background-color:"|
|align=left|Arnold Tulokhonov
|align=left|Independent
|
|7.59%
|-
|style="background-color:"|
|align=left|Vladimir Markov
|align=left|Independent
|
|5.10%
|-
|style="background-color:"|
|align=left|Tsyrzhima Sergeeva
|align=left|Independent
|
|4.59%
|-
|style="background-color:"|
|align=left|Vladimir Prokopyev
|align=left|Independent
|
|2.78%
|-
|style="background-color:#FFF22E"|
|align=left|Bayar Tumurov
|align=left|Beer Lovers Party
|
|1.76%
|-
|style="background-color:#000000"|
|colspan=2 |against all
|
|13.52%
|-
| colspan="5" style="background-color:#E9E9E9;"|
|- style="font-weight:bold"
| colspan="3" style="text-align:left;" | Total
| 
| 100%
|-
| colspan="5" style="background-color:#E9E9E9;"|
|- style="font-weight:bold"
| colspan="4" |Source:
|
|}

1999

|-
! colspan=2 style="background-color:#E9E9E9;text-align:left;vertical-align:top;" |Candidate
! style="background-color:#E9E9E9;text-align:left;vertical-align:top;" |Party
! style="background-color:#E9E9E9;text-align:right;" |Votes
! style="background-color:#E9E9E9;text-align:right;" |%
|-
|style="background-color:#3B9EDF"|
|align=left|Bato Semenov
|align=left|Fatherland – All Russia
|
|34.99%
|-
|style="background-color:"|
|align=left|Viktor Izmaylov
|align=left|Independent
|
|20.03%
|-
|style="background-color:"|
|align=left|Sergey Budazhapov
|align=left|Communist Party
|
|13.87%
|-
|style="background-color:"|
|align=left|Svetlana Naychukova (incumbent)
|align=left|Independent
|
|5.61%
|-
|style="background-color:#084284"|
|align=left|Vladimir Markov
|align=left|Spiritual Heritage
|
|5.34%
|-
|style="background-color:"|
|align=left|Yevgeny Paltsev
|align=left|Independent
|
|3.41%
|-
|style="background-color:"|
|align=left|Svetlana Zangeeva
|align=left|Independent
|
|1.57%
|-
|style="background-color:"|
|align=left|Oleg Khomutov
|align=left|Independent
|
|1.52%
|-
|style="background-color:"|
|align=left|Igor Pronkin
|align=left|Independent
|
|1.44%
|-
|style="background-color:"|
|align=left|Tsyrzhima Sergeeva
|align=left|Independent
|
|1.36%
|-
|style="background-color:#000000"|
|colspan=2 |against all
|
|8.34%
|-
| colspan="5" style="background-color:#E9E9E9;"|
|- style="font-weight:bold"
| colspan="3" style="text-align:left;" | Total
| 
| 100%
|-
| colspan="5" style="background-color:#E9E9E9;"|
|- style="font-weight:bold"
| colspan="4" |Source:
|
|}

2003

|-
! colspan=2 style="background-color:#E9E9E9;text-align:left;vertical-align:top;" |Candidate
! style="background-color:#E9E9E9;text-align:left;vertical-align:top;" |Party
! style="background-color:#E9E9E9;text-align:right;" |Votes
! style="background-color:#E9E9E9;text-align:right;" |%
|-
|style="background-color:"|
|align=left|Vasily Kuznetsov
|align=left|United Russia
|
|30.26%
|-
|style="background-color:#00A1FF"|
|align=left|Innokenty Beloborodov
|align=left|Party of Russia's Rebirth-Russian Party of Life
|
|29.92%
|-
|style="background-color:"|
|align=left|Aleksandr Budaev
|align=left|Independent
|
|10.90%
|-
|style="background-color:"|
|align=left|Nikolay Kondakov
|align=left|Independent
|
|6.89%
|-
|style="background-color:"|
|align=left|Bair Tsyrenov
|align=left|Independent
|
|5.16%
|-
|style="background-color:"|
|align=left|Aleksandr Kardash
|align=left|Liberal Democratic Party
|
|3.35%
|-
|style="background-color:"|
|align=left|Andrey Yakunin
|align=left|Independent
|
|1.05%
|-
|style="background-color:#000000"|
|colspan=2 |against all
|
|9.32%
|-
| colspan="5" style="background-color:#E9E9E9;"|
|- style="font-weight:bold"
| colspan="3" style="text-align:left;" | Total
| 
| 100%
|-
| colspan="5" style="background-color:#E9E9E9;"|
|- style="font-weight:bold"
| colspan="4" |Source:
|
|}

2016

|-
! colspan=2 style="background-color:#E9E9E9;text-align:left;vertical-align:top;" |Candidate
! style="background-color:#E9E9E9;text-align:left;vertical-align:top;" |Party
! style="background-color:#E9E9E9;text-align:right;" |Votes
! style="background-color:#E9E9E9;text-align:right;" |%
|-
|style="background-color:"|
|align=left|Aldar Damdinov
|align=left|United Russia
|
|37.56%
|-
|style="background-color:"|
|align=left|Mikhail Slipenchuk
|align=left|Party of Growth
|
|22.75%
|-
|style="background-color:"|
|align=left|Bair Tsyrenov
|align=left|Communist Party
|
|16.06%
|-
|style="background-color:"|
|align=left|Oksana Bukholtseva
|align=left|A Just Russia
|
|11.02%
|-
|style="background-color:"|
|align=left|Sergey Dorosh
|align=left|Liberal Democratic Party
|
|4.93%
|-
|style="background:"| 
|align=left|Bayar Tsydenov
|align=left|Civic Platform
|
|3.15%
|-
| colspan="5" style="background-color:#E9E9E9;"|
|- style="font-weight:bold"
| colspan="3" style="text-align:left;" | Total
| 
| 100%
|-
| colspan="5" style="background-color:#E9E9E9;"|
|- style="font-weight:bold"
| colspan="4" |Source:
|
|}

2021

|-
! colspan=2 style="background-color:#E9E9E9;text-align:left;vertical-align:top;" |Candidate
! style="background-color:#E9E9E9;text-align:left;vertical-align:top;" |Party
! style="background-color:#E9E9E9;text-align:right;" |Votes
! style="background-color:#E9E9E9;text-align:right;" |%
|-
|style="background-color:"|
|align=left|Vyacheslav Damdintsurunov
|align=left|United Russia
|
|37.41%
|-
|style="background-color:"|
|align=left|Bair Tsyrenov
|align=left|Communist Party
|
|19.86%
|-
|style="background: "| 
|align=left|Sergey Zverev
|align=left|The Greens
|
|7.46%
|-
|style="background-color: "|
|align=left|Igor Bobkov
|align=left|Party of Pensioners
|
|7.34%
|-
|style="background-color:"|
|align=left|Maksim Buvalin
|align=left|New People
|
|6.35%
|-
|style="background-color:"|
|align=left|Oksana Bukholtseva
|align=left|A Just Russia — For Truth
|
|5.61%
|-
|style="background:"| 
|align=left|Bayar Tsydenov
|align=left|Civic Platform
|
|5.03%
|-
|style="background:"| 
|align=left|Damdin Bolotov
|align=left|Communists of Russia
|
|4.22%
|-
|style="background-color:"|
|align=left|Sergey Dorosh
|align=left|Liberal Democratic Party
|
|2.34%
|-
|style="background-color: "|
|align=left|Yevgeny Menshikov
|align=left|Russian Party of Freedom and Justice
|
|1.06%
|-
| colspan="5" style="background-color:#E9E9E9;"|
|- style="font-weight:bold"
| colspan="3" style="text-align:left;" | Total
| 
| 100%
|-
| colspan="5" style="background-color:#E9E9E9;"|
|- style="font-weight:bold"
| colspan="4" |Source:
|
|}

Notes

References

Russian legislative constituencies
Politics of Buryatia